Bihttoš (Rebel) is a Canadian short documentary film, directed by Elle-Máijá Tailfeathers and released in 2014. Blending live action and animation, the film depicts the relationship between her Sami father and her Blackfoot mother, focusing in particular on the way her father's childhood experiences in Norway's residential school system contributed to their breakup.

The film premiered at the ImagineNATIVE Film + Media Arts Festival in 2014, and was named to the Toronto International Film Festival's Canada's Top Ten. It was shortlisted for the Canadian Screen Award for Best Short Documentary at the 4th Canadian Screen Awards.

References

External links

2014 films
Canadian short documentary films
Films directed by Elle-Máijá Tailfeathers
2010s English-language films
2010s Canadian films
2014 short documentary films